Mahmudabad-e Seyyed (also Romanized as Maḩmūdābād-e Seyyed and Mahmood Abad Seyyed; also known as Maḩmūdābād and Maḩmūdābād-e Sādāt) is a village in Mahmudabad-e Seyyed Rural District, in the Central District of Sirjan County, Kerman Province, Iran. At the 2006 census, its population was 3,060, in 763 families.

References 

Populated places in Sirjan County